Québec-Centre may refer to:
 Quebec-Centre, a former federal electoral district in the area of Quebec City
 Québec-Centre (provincial electoral district), a former provincial electoral district in the area of Quebec City